Alleh may refer to:
 Alleh-ye Band-e Qir
 Alleh-ye Hajj Abdol Ali